David Cuauhtémoc Galindo Delgado (born 7 December 1975) is a Mexican politician affiliated with the PAN. He currently serves as Deputy of the LXII Legislature of the Mexican Congress representing Sonora.

References

1975 births
Living people
People from Nogales, Sonora
National Action Party (Mexico) politicians
21st-century Mexican politicians
Universidad Iberoamericana alumni
Monterrey Institute of Technology and Higher Education alumni
Politicians from Sonora
Members of the Congress of Sonora
Deputies of the LXII Legislature of Mexico
Members of the Chamber of Deputies (Mexico) for Sonora